Crni Lug is a village in Primorje-Gorski Kotar County in Croatia, on the territory of the city of Delnice. It is connected by the D32 highway.

References

Populated places in Primorje-Gorski Kotar County